Tommaso Fazello (New Latin Fazellus, 1498 – 8 April 1570) was an Italian Dominican friar, historian and antiquarian. He is known as the father of Sicilian history. He is the author of the first printed history of Sicily: De Rebus Siculis Decades Duae, published in Palermo in 1558 in Latin. He was born in Sciacca, Sicily and died in Palermo, Sicily.

He rediscovered the ruins of the ancient Sicilian towns of Akrai (modern Palazzolo Acreide), Selinus (modern Selinunte)  and Heraclea Minoa. He also rediscovered the Temple of Olympian Zeus at Akragas (modern Agrigento).

In 1555, he taught at the Convent of San Domenico, Palermo, which later became the University of Palermo.

Biography 
Born at Sciacca in Sicily, Fazello studied at Palermo and entered the Dominican Order. He next studied at Rome and at Padua, where he received his doctorate. At Rome, he became friends with the humanist scholar Paolo Giovio, who encouraged him to write a history of Sicily. Returning to Palermo, Fazello undertook to teach philosophy and at the same time kept up his religious exercises. He so devoted himself to his studies that eventually he gave up all but one meal a day and reduced the number of hours he slept each night. His history of Sicily, De rebus siculis decades duae (Palermo, 1558), which was his only publication, included material on the ancient history and antiquities of Sicily, showing an immense personal knowledge of topography that allowed him to identify, on the basis of ancient authors, many of the major sites of Sicily. His work is still considered fundamental for the study of ancient Sicily.

Opere

Bibliography

References

External links
 Storia di Sicilia, Deche due, Tommaso Fazello, - Internet Archive
 Storia di Sicilia, Deche due: Tradotte in Lingua Toscana (1830), Tommaso Fazello, G. Bertini - Internet Archive
 An online copy of "De Rebus Siculis (Historia di Sicilia) with other ancient books, photographically scanned by The Freaknet Medialab.

1498 births
1570 deaths
People from Sciacca
Italian Dominicans
Historians of Sicily
16th-century Latin-language writers
Academic staff of the University of Palermo
16th-century Italian historians